Institute of Rural Management Anand (IRMA) is an autonomous institution and premier business school located in Anand Gujarat, India with the mandate of contributing to the professional management of rural organizations. IRMA was founded with the belief, borne out by Verghese Kurien’s work in the dairy co-operatives which revolutionized the dairy industry in the country (Operation Flood), that the key to effective rural development is professional management. It is considered as the best business school in the Rural and Agricultural Business Management Sector of India.

The Institute was established with the support of the Swiss Agency for Development and Corporation, the Government of India, the erstwhile Indian Dairy Corporation, the NDDB (National Dairy Development Board) and the Government of Gujarat. The IRMA campus was designed by the famous architect Achyut Kanvinde.

IRMA provides management training, support and research facilities to students committed to rural development; in this process it has brought within its ambit several co-operatives, non-government organizations, government development agencies, international development organizations and funding agencies.

Over the years the convocation of IRMA is graced by National and International luminaries from the academic, cultural, spiritual, and political spheres. Former Prime Minister Indira Gandhi attended IRMA's first annual conference in 1982.

History

Michael Halse, then a Food and Agriculture Organization (FAO) planning adviser with NDDB, was one of the members responsible for conceptualizing this new discipline of rural management. Another person involved with the institute was the organizational behavior academic Dr. Kamla Chowdhry , who also served briefly as the director of the institute and played a key mentoring role in its formative years. The former director of Indian Institute of Management Ahmedabad Ravi J. Matthai contributed; through his documented learning from the Jawaja experiment. Matthai stressed the need for a new type of management education, different from the conventional Indian Institute of Management one: for working on rural development problems.

The institute was initially budgeted as a center for management and consultancy for rural development, under the second phase of the Operation Flood program. Under the chairmanship of Dr. Verghese Kurien, IRMA evolved quickly to enlarge its mandate to professionalize management of rural producers’ organizations and create a body of knowledge in the field of rural management.

One of the pioneering and senior faculty in the initial years was anthropologist and equity-feminist scholar Leela Dube. One of her studies, through field work in five Southeast Asian countries, put the organization on the international social science research map.

Beginning with co-operatives funded by NDDB, IRMA has reached out to the rural sector through development organizations engaged with issues of rural life such as natural resource management (especially water and forests), rural health, local governance institution, livelihood, migration, micro finance, and deploying IT for rural areas.

Since inception, the focus of IRMA has been on strengthening the management capacities in non-governmental organizations and organizations that are controlled by users of the services (rather than the conventional capital investor-centered business corporate).  IRMA claims that its branding and commitment to a unique field of management makes it unique among management institutes of India.

Academics 
IRMA offers various full-time and part time postgraduate programmes, leading to an MBA degree. It also offers diploma programmes.

Admissions 
IRMA offers different academic programs and has admission processes and eligibility respectively. The selection process for admission in PGDM(RM), FPM(RM), RM(X) and MDPs. varies depending on the nature of program one opts for. IRMA accepts scores from common entrance exams like CAT and XAT. Other major aspects for admission are academic performance and work experience.

IRMA also conducts its Written Ability Test (WAT) and Personal Interviews (PI) of selected candidates. If a candidate opts for selected offline mode for giving Personal Interview, she / he is given option of Anand, Bangalore, Delhi, Guwahati, and Kolkata.

Rankings 

IRMA was ranked 55 in the Management category of the 2021 ranking of the National Institutional Ranking Framework (NIRF). IRMA was ranked 5th Best B School in Chronicle India B- School Survey 2019, IRMA was ranked 5th best B-school among the top 75 private B-schools of India and 10th overall among the top 100 B-schools of India , as per Times B-School Survey 2019. IRMA Ranked 8th in UTD Top 10 Indian Business School Ranking for Research.
It was ranked 17 in Outlooks "Top 150 Private MBA Institutions" of 2020 ranking.

 Dr. Verghese Kurien Memorial Lecture 
To commemorate the memory of the founder of the Institute, the annual "Dr. Verghese Kurien Memorial Lecture" has been instituted from 2012: to be held on his birth anniversary. The first lecture in 2012 was delivered by M. S. Swaminathan.
The second lecture in 2013 was delivered by Vijay Shankar Vyas. The third lecture in 2014 was delivered by the Governor of Reserve Bank of India, Raghuram Rajan.The fourth annual lecture in 2015 was delivered by the Chief Economic Adviser to the Government of India, Arvind Subramanian on 21 November 2015. It was followed by Vikram Singh Mehta in 2016, Dr. Ramesh Chand in 2017, Amitabh Kant in 2018, Dr. P.S. Goel in 2019, Dr. Krishnamurthy V. Subramanian in 2020 and Arun Maira in 2021.

Campus

The campus is fully residential and equipped with student hostels, mess, lecture halls, seminar rooms, library, faculty and administrative offices, auditorium, executive training and development center, faculty and staff housing, dispensary, and other support facilities. The IRMA staff co-operative store caters to the residents’ daily necessities. Faculty and staff live in the campus quarters provided, thereby providing facilities for interaction with the participants beyond classrooms.

 IRMA Auditorium, with a seating capacity of 400, is used for major events of the institute and for entertainment. Movies are screened for the participants of programmes and the residents of the campus. It is used for musical concerts hosted by the Society for Promotion of Indian Culture and Music amongst Youth (SPIC-MACAY) and the cultural programs hosted by the students.
 The Students Activities Center (SAC) has a gym-cum-sports complex, with facilities for a workout, badminton and table tennis courts.
 The Students' Mess', with students as members is managed by students themselves, serves food to residential students of various academic programmes.
 A co-operative store on the campus is open in the evenings six days a week and provides all the items required by the residents on the campus. It is stocked with provisions and stationery.
 A campus dispensary supplies medication. The medical officer visits the campus for an hour every day, and a staff nurse resides on the campus to attend to medical emergencies.

Ravi J Matthai Library 
The library is named after Prof. Ravi J Matthai, one of the founder members of the Institute and was formally inaugurated by the then Prime Minister of India, late Shri Rajiv Gandhi, on March 22, 1986. The Library supports the mission of IRMA through the provision of information resources and services. The library provides the academic community with information for fulfilling research requirements, coursework assignments, and professional development. This is achieved through collection development, networking, electronic information retrieval, instruction in search strategy and assisted access to an array of resources and data.

Accommodation 
The Executive Training and Development Center (ETDC) is equipped with 40 single-occupancy air-conditioned rooms, a dining hall, and a lounge. It has uninterrupted internet services through a 150-Mbps radio link. This accommodation facility is available for executive training programmes and conferences planned by the faculty.

Convocation 
The annual convocation at IRMA is conducted in a most unique manner, reflecting the true Indian ethos and culture. Over the years, the convocation has been graced by national and international luminaries from the academic, cultural, spiritual and political spheres. in 2022, Amit Shah, Hon'ble Minister of Home Affairs and Minister of Cooperation, Government of India was the Chief Guest of the Convocation.

Notable faculty 

 Ravi J. Matthai -  Management education administrator, noted for establishing Indian Institute of Management, Ahmedabad and Institute of Rural Management, Anand.
 Leela Dube - Anthropologist and equity-feminist scholar
 Yoginder K Alagh -  Noted Indian economist, former Union Minister of Government of India & ex-Chairman of IRMA.
 Vivek Bhandari - Indian professor & ex-Director of IRMA. 
 Deep Joshi - Indian social worker , NGO activist and a recipient of the Magsaysay award. Ex-Chairman of IRMA.

Notable alumni

 Sanjay Ghose - Founder URMUL Rural Health Research and Development Trust and Charka Development Communication Network
 Dr. R.S. Sodhi  - Managing Director, Gujarat Cooperative Milk Marketing Federation (AMUL)
 Sankar Datta - Indian academic & professional development worker.
Vishal Narain -  Academician , Researcher & Public Policy Analyst 
 Satish Babu (PRM3) - Director, International Centre for Free and Open Source Software (ICFOSS).
 Raju Narisetti - Founder of Mint (newspaper), Senior Vice-President, News Corporation
Sandeep Dikshit - Member of Parliament of 14th Lok Sabha and 15th Lok Sabha representing East Delhi
Daman Singh - Indian writer and daughter of Former Prime Minister of India, Manmohan Singh.
Amir Ullah Khan - Indian economist. Professor at the Dr. Marri Channa Reddy Human Resource Development Institute of Telangana of the Government of Telangana.
G. V. L. Narasimha Rao - National Spokesperson of Bharatiya Janata Party
Syed Safawi - Managing Director and Group CEO of VLCC , Ex-CEO of Viom Networks
Gouthami - Recipient of Cartier Women's Initiative Awards 2010 & Founder of Travel Another India
Praveen Morchhale - 65th National Film Awards of India winner and UNESCO Gandhi Medal Winner film director-writer. Widow of Silence, Walking With The Wind, Barefoot to Goa)
Praveen Morchhale - National Award Winning Filmmaker ( Barefoot To Goa)
 Chitaroopa Palit Narmada Bachao Andolan activist

References

External links
Official website

Institute of Rural Management Anand
Business schools in Gujarat
Rural development organisations in India